Irganox 1098 is the trade name for N,N′-(hexane-1,6-diyl)bis[3-(3,5-di-tert-butyl-4-hydroxyphenyl)propanamide], a primary antioxidant manufactured by BASF primarily used for stabilizing polymers, especially polyamides. It is noted for its thermal stability as well as its non-discoloring properties.

See also
Pentaerythritol tetrakis(3,5-di-tert-butyl-4-hydroxyhydrocinnamate)

References

Phenol antioxidants